The 1912 Colorado Silver and Gold football team was an American football team that represented the University of Colorado as a member of the Rocky Mountain Conference (RMC) during the 1912 college football season. Head coach Fred Folsom led the team to a 2–2 mark in the RMC and 6–3 overall.

Schedule

References

Colorado
Colorado Buffaloes football seasons
Colorado Silver and Gold football